Delaware Breakwater Range Front Light was a lighthouse in Delaware, 
United States, on the Delaware Breakwater, Delaware Bay, Delaware.

History
Delaware Breakwater West End Lighthouse was built in 1838. In 1881 this light became the front light of the Delaware Breakwater Range. When this light was deactivated in 1903, the Delaware Breakwater West End Light became the front light in the range. The unoccupied house was destroyed in 1950.

References

Lighthouses completed in 1838
Lighthouses in Sussex County, Delaware